Kungri Monastery  is a  Buddhist monastery of the Nyingma sect of Tibetan Buddhism  in the Pin Valley in  Lahul and Spiti, Himachal Pradesh, northern India.

Kungri is Spiti's second oldest monastery, built around 1330. The gompa consists of three detached rectangular blocks facing east.

It is noted for its sword dance by the buzhens of Mud village on the right bank of the Pin River. H.E Rinpoche la at Urgyan Sangnag Choling Monastery (Kungri Gompa, Pin Valley, Spiti )

Footnotes

Religious organizations established in the 1330s
Buddhist monasteries in Himachal Pradesh
Nyingma monasteries and temples
Buddhism in Lahaul and Spiti district
Buildings and structures in Lahaul and Spiti district
1330 establishments in Asia
14th-century establishments in India